Symplocos laeteviridis is a plant in the family Symplocaceae, native to tropical Asia. The specific epithet laeteviridis means "bright green" and refers to the leaves.

Description
The smooth bark may be green, grey or brown.

Distribution and habitat
Symplocos laeteviridis is native to Peninsular Malaysia, Sumatra, Borneo and Sulawesi.

Varieties
Numerous varieties of Symplocos laeteviridis are recognised:
Symplocos laeteviridis var. alabensis  – Sabah
Symplocos laeteviridis var. alternifolia  – Sabah
Symplocos laeteviridis var. basirotunda  – Borneo
Symplocos laeteviridis var. kinabaluensis  – Mount Kinabalu (Sabah)
Symplocos laeteviridis var. laeteviridis – Peninsular Malaysia, Sumatra, Borneo, Sulawesi
Symplocos laeteviridis var. mjoebergii  – Borneo
Symplocos laeteviridis var. pauciflora  – Borneo
Symplocos laeteviridis var. velutinosa  – Sabah, Sarawak

References

laeteviridis
Flora of Peninsular Malaysia
Flora of Sumatra
Flora of Borneo
Flora of Sulawesi
Plants described in 1894
Taxa named by Otto Stapf